The Bishop of Ramsbury was an episcopal title used by medieval English-Catholic diocesan bishops in the Anglo-Saxon English church. The title takes its name from the village of Ramsbury in Wiltshire, and was first used in the 10th and 11th centuries by the Anglo-Saxon Bishops of Ramsbury. In Saxon times, Ramsbury was an important location for the Church, and several of the early bishops went on to become Archbishops of Canterbury.

The ancient bishopric of Ramsbury was created in 909 by Plegmund, Archbishop of Canterbury, as part of a division of the two West Saxon bishoprics into five smaller ones. Wiltshire and Berkshire were taken from the bishopric of Winchester to form the new diocese of Ramsbury. It was occasionally referred to as the bishopric of Ramsbury and Sonning. In 1058 it was joined with the bishopric of Sherborne to form the diocese of Sarum (Salisbury), and the see was translated to Old Sarum in 1075.

Medieval bishops diocesan

References

Further reading
 Powicke, F. Maurice and E. B. Fryde Handbook of British Chronology 2nd. ed. London:Royal Historical Society 1961

909 establishments
10th-century establishments in England
 
Catholic titular sees in Europe
Ramsbury